Robert Andrew Garcia (born 15 April 1986) is a Filipino male professional squash player.

He reached his highest career singles rankings of 216 in February 2018 during the 2018 PSA World Tour.  He has represented Philippines at several international competitive events including the Southeast Asian Games, Asian Games, PSA World Tour and Asian Individual Squash Championships. He is the current leading male squash player to represent Philippines at international arena.

At the 2018 Asian Games, he reached round of 16 in the men's singles.

References 

1986 births
Living people
Filipino male squash players
Sportspeople from Manila
Asian Games competitors for the Philippines
Squash players at the 2006 Asian Games
Squash players at the 2018 Asian Games
Southeast Asian Games medalists in squash
Southeast Asian Games gold medalists for the Philippines
Southeast Asian Games competitors for the Philippines
Southeast Asian Games silver medalists for the Philippines
Southeast Asian Games bronze medalists for the Philippines
Competitors at the 2005 Southeast Asian Games
Competitors at the 2007 Southeast Asian Games
Competitors at the 2015 Southeast Asian Games
Competitors at the 2017 Southeast Asian Games
Competitors at the 2019 Southeast Asian Games